Mike Dudek (born August 21, 1995) is an American football wide receiver for the Illinois Fighting Illini. As a true freshman, Dudek broke Illinois' school record for receiving yards by a freshman, previously set by Arrelious Benn in 2007.

High school
During his senior season, Dudek recorded 2,361 yards of Total offense, averaging 196.8 yards per game, and caught 23 TDs. This earned Dudek the Upstate Eight Conference Player of the Year award in 2013 and 1st Team All-State honors from the News-Gazette, Chicago Tribune, and IHSFCA. Despite these honors, Dudek's only received two Football Championship Subdivision offers, from North Dakota State and Illinois State. Illinois was Dudek's only Football Bowl Subdivision scholarship offer and he was primarily recruited by Mike Bellamy.

College career
Dudek enrolled early at Illinois and participated in spring 2014 practices, impressing coaches and drawing early comparisons to Wes Welker. After Illinois' week 2 win over Western Kentucky in which Dudek had four receptions for 55 yards and a touchdown, he was named Big Ten Freshman of the Week. Later in the season Dudek was named to the Biletnikoff Award watch list. The Biletnikoff Award is awarded annually to the most outstanding receiver in American college football. In the October 4th game at home against Purdue, Dudek became the fourth player in school history to catch at least 200 yards in a game, joining Steve Hull, A. J. Jenkins, and College Football Hall of Fame Inductee David Williams. At the end of the 2014 season, Dudek led all Big Ten Conference freshmen in receptions and receiving yards. In 2015 spring workouts, Dudek tore his ACL and was medically redshirted, ending his season.

Statistics
Through the end of the 2017 regular season, Dudek's statistics are as follows:

Personal life
Due to his physical stature as a wide receiver, Dudek oftentimes draws comparisons to NFL Pro Bowl wideout Wes Welker. Dudek has an older brother, Danny, who played college football for Dayton.

References

External links
Illinois Fighting Illini bio

1995 births
Living people
Sportspeople from Naperville, Illinois
Players of American football from Illinois
American football wide receivers
Illinois Fighting Illini football players